This is a list of notable travel and tourism magazines.

Travel and tourism-related magazines

In circulation

 Afar (2009)
 Arthur Frommer's Budget Travel (1999; published by Intellitravel Media)
 British Columbia Magazine (1959; My Passion Media)
 Caravan (1933; Warners Midlands Plc)
 Caribbean Beat (1992; published by Media and Editorial Projects Limited, inflight magazine of Caribbean Airlines)
 Condé Nast Traveler (1987; published by Condé Nast Publications)
 Darling (2009)
 Departures Magazine (1984; published by American Express Publishing)
 EnRoute, inflight magazine of Air Canada
 Escapism Travel Magazine 
 Executive Travel magazine (2002; published by American Express)
 FIDO Friendly (2003)
 Get Lost Magazine (2004; published by Grin Creative)
 Hana Hou! (1998; published by Pacific Travelogue Inc., as the inflight magazine of Hawaiian Airlines)
 Islands (published by Bonnier Corporation)
 Holiday (1946–1977; Curtis Publishing Company, relaunched in Paris, France, in 2014)
 Lonely Planet Traveller (2009; published by the BBC in the UK, monthly. Also Argentine, Singaporean and Indian editions, also published in the Netherlands and Germany by Pijper Media six times a year)
 Maui No Ka 'Oi Magazine (published by the Haynes Publishing Group, bi-monthly regional travel focus)
 Metropolis (1994)
 National Geographic Traveler (1984; National Geographic)
 Outside (1977; published by Mariah Media)
 New Mexico Magazine (1923; published by the New Mexico Tourism Department)
 Road & Travel Magazine (1989; published by Caldwell Communications, Michigan)
 RoadRUNNER (2001; published by RoadRUNNER Publishing, focuses on motorcycle touring and travel)
 Saveur (1994; published by Bonnier Corporation)
 Sidetrip Travel Magazine (Manila, focuses on travel in the Philippines)
 Sports+Travel Hong Kong (Hong Kong, free magazine that focuses on sports related travel from Hong Kong)
 Suitcase Magazine (2012; published by SUITCASE Magazine)
 The Sunday Times Travel Magazine (2003; [UK] published by News UK)
 Sunset (1898; Sunset Publishing Corporation)
 Texas Highways (1980)
 TNT (1983; published by TNT Publishing, London, free magazine for Australian, New Zealand and South African expatriates)
 Today's Traveller (1997; published by Gill India Communications Pvt. Ltd. (GICPL), Indian international travel magazine)
 Travel + Leisure (1971; published by Exposure Media Marketing)
 Travel Agent (1930; trade, published by Questex Media Group)
 Travel in Taiwan (Vision International Publishing Co. Ltd., on behalf of the Taiwan Tourism Bureau)
 Travel Trade Gazette (TTG) (1953; trade, published by United Bupsiness Media, London)
 Travel Weekly (1958)
 Vagabond (1987, Sweden)
 Wanderlust Magazine (1993; Independent; eight issues per annum; editor and publisher is Lyn Hughes)
 Weg!
 Where (1938)
 Yankee (1935)
Arizona Highways (1921;published by the Arizona Department of Transportation)

Out of print
 Blue (1997–2000; tourism magazine)
 Caribbean Travel & Life (c. 1986–2013; published by Bonnier Corporation, replaced by Islands magazine)
 Gulfscapes Magazine (2001–2012; published by Craig and Victoria Rogers)
 Travel + Leisure Golf (1998–2009; American Express)
 Travel Holiday (1901–2003; New York Central Railroad, Shane family, Reader's Digest, Hachette Filipacchi Media U.S.)
 Walkabout magazine (1934–1974; Australian National Travel Association)

References

Travel

Magazines